LOUIS: The Louisiana Library Network is a library consortium made up of 48 college and university libraries in the state of Louisiana. LOUIS was founded in 1992 by library deans and directors at both public and private institutions in the state. LOUIS is governed by the Louisiana Board of Regents; an executive board made up of consortia members advises the consortia. LOUIS is also a member of the International Coalition of Library Consortia, or ICOLC.

The consortia's work includes technology support, cooperative procurement of electronic resources, affordable access to course materials, digital inclusion, and community building and professional development.

Members

See also 

 List of library consortia

References 

Organizations established in 1992
Library consortia in Louisiana